Kerr, Stuart and Company Ltd was a locomotive manufacturer in Stoke-on-Trent, England.

History
It was founded in 1881 by James Kerr as "James Kerr & Company", and became "Kerr, Stuart & Company" from 1883 when John Stuart was taken on as a partner. The business started in Glasgow, Scotland, but during this time they were only acting as agents ordering locomotives from established manufacturers, among them Falcon, John Fowler & Co. and Hartley, Arnoux and Fanning. They bought the last-named company in 1892 and moved into the California Works in Stoke to begin building all their own locomotives. Hartley, Arnoux and Fanning had also been building railway and tramway plant. This side of their business was sold to Dick, Kerr and Co. in Preston.

Notable Kerr, Stuart employees
 R. J. Mitchell, Premium Apprentice, later to design the Supermarine Spitfire aircraft.
 L. T. C. Rolt, Premium Apprentice, later to be an author and canal/railway preservation pioneer.
 T. C. B. Coleman, Premium Apprentice, later Chief Locomotive Draughtsman of the London Midland & Scottish Railway during the 1930s

Kerr, Stuart standard designs
Kerr, Stuart were known for producing a number of standard designs with many engines being built for stock and sold 'off the shelf' to customers. The names of these locomotive types were often derived from the purchaser of the first of that type or from the name it was given.

The Kerr, Stuart designs are typified by having a single trailing truck (allowing a large firebox to be placed behind the driving wheels) and/or having a saddle tank. Several designs of side tank locomotive were produced that shared a chassis and boiler with a saddle tank design and it is not unknown for a standard chassis from one design to be used with a different design's standard boiler to produce a locomotive to suit a customer's special requirements.

Standard gauge designs

Narrow gauge designs

Steam railmotors
Kerr, Stuart had a large joiners shop and a significant passenger coach construction business. They were therefore very well placed to build steam railmotors. Their first was a diminutive  gauge saloon for the Maharajah of Gwalior in 1904 followed by a batch of 12 standard gauge railcars in 1905, six for the Taff Vale Railway, two for the Lancashire and Yorkshire Railway, two for the Great Western Railway, one for the Great Indian Peninsula Railway and one for the Buenos Aires Great Southern Railway. The last two in Indian broad gauge. The GWR gave a repeat order in 1906 for a further 12 slightly more powerful units. The Mauritius Government Railways ordered one in 1907. The largest rail motor order was for 15 from the Italian State Railways.

See also Kerr Stuart steam railmotor (one-off, built 1912, for Victorian Railways)

Custom-built designs

In addition to the company's standard designs the company accepted many orders to build to the customers' own designs in all gauges. The most impressive example for this certainly are the legendary 0-4-0LB locobreaks from 1900, strong and heavy tank engines designed to secure the trains through a cable claw on SPR (São Paulo Railway) and later EFSJ (Estrada de Ferro Santos a Jundiaí)'s  gauge mountain cable incline between Paranapiacaba and Piaçagüera. Six of them are preserved.

An example of a narrow-gauge 0-4-0 tank engine, number 652 built in 1899, worked in the docks at Walvis Bay, Namibia, until the 1950s and is now preserved in a purpose-built glass-windowed display hut in the forecourt of Walvis Bay station.

The California works produced in 1903/4 a 4-6-0 design for several Irish  gauge lines including a 4-6-2T version for the Londonderry and Lough Swilly Railway. For Chile a very large  gauge double six-coupled bogie Meyer followed in 1904 by five American style bar-framed 2-8-0 tender engines for the  gauge Interocianic and Mexican Eastern Railways. In May 1910 they built a  gauge "modified Fairlie" for service in Madras. This was not a Fairlie but just two 0-4-2T engines permanently coupled back to back, the only articulation being between the two complete engines. They received a repeat order for this combination.

A truly remarkable standard gauge build of 1910 was a class of four handsome 4-2-2 express passenger locomotives to the design of E. J. Dunstan for the Shanghai Nanking Railway. The order was received on 19 April 1910 and the novel design required the production of totally new drawings and patterns for all parts. Even so, the first engine was steamed just seven weeks later on 8 June 1910. In service these engines, probably the last, and the biggest, single driver engines ever built, proved to be fast (60 mph), smooth running, and very economical on fuel when compared with similar 4-4-0 engines on the same line.

From the  gauge Gwalior Light Railway in India, the company received several orders for locomotives and a wide variety of rolling stock over the years, culminating in the construction of four large 2-8-2 tender engines in 1928. Six very powerful superheated 4-8-0 mixed traffic locomotives built in 1929 were the last of a series of 4-4-0 and 4-6-0 machines built for the Buenos Aires Central Railway of Argentina.

In common with most British locomotive builders, in the postwar era Kerr, Stuart received a number of large orders from the mainline companies who were seeking to replace obsolete inherited equipment with their own standard designs. In 1920 the Metropolitan Railway ordered eight superheated 4-4-4 passenger tank engines for the Aylesbury service. Between 1925 and 1927 the Stoke works built fifty standard class 4F 0-6-0 goods engines for the London Midland and Scottish Railway and in 1929 and 1930 a batch of 25 GWR 5700 Class 0-6-0PTs were built for the Great Western Railway.

Diesel locomotives
In the late 1920s a number of diesel locomotives were built.  These were available with two or three axles for various track gauges.  The engines were by McLaren-Benz in 2-cylinder (30 hp), 4-cylinder (60 hp) or 6-cylinder (90 hp) form.  Transmission was mechanical and final drive was by roller chains.

They were very successful even though technology moved on quickly. Further development was stopped when Kerr, Stuart's went into receivership, but the Hunslet range of diesel locomotives was based on these. At least 3 Kerr, Stuart diesel locomotives have survived into preservation but none is in original condition having been given different engines.

The company in liquidation

On 17 April 1930 a petition calling for the company to be wound up compulsorily was presented in the High Court (Chancery Division) by the Midland Bank. At a hearing held on 8 May 1930 this petition was withdrawn on settlement of an £8,000 guarantee. However, the sale of the works to George Cohen, Sons & Co Ltd was announced in August 1930; a skeleton staff was employed to complete contracts in progress. Another winding-up petition was presented on 10 September 1930 and an order was made on 14 October. At the creditors' meeting held on 14 November Herbert Langham Reed, the company's chairman and managing director, attributed the failure of the company to the locking up of capital in the Peninsular Locomotive Company, registered in India 1921 to build locomotives (Kerr, Stuart held 80% of the capital and loaned £78,000), the [April] winding-up petition, which had resulted in a loss of confidence in the company, and 'to liabilities incurred by the company in supporting other companies'.
Company funds had, apparently, been used to finance a company called Evos Sliding Doorways. This company's failure had triggered the Midland Bank petition. In LTC Rolt's autobiography "The Landscape Trilogy" it is also alleged that the company secretary was discovered to have committed suicide in Kerr, Stuart's London offices, and a large quantity of papers was found to have been burnt in the fireplace. The firm's goodwill (designs, spare parts, etc.) was bought by the Hunslet Engine Company.

Some locomotives were built by W. G. Bagnall to Kerr, Stuart designs, a result of the chief Kerr, Stuart draughtsman, F. H. B. Harris, and a number of other Kerr, Stuart staff being employed by Bagnall's. These locomotives include examples of the Haig and Matary classes.

The last steam locomotive built in Britain for industrial use, was a Hunslet built Brazil class engine in 1971. This locomotive is now running on the private Statfold Barn Railway.

The Corris Railway commissioned a new locomotive based on the "Tattoo" design of its original No.4 (KS 4047 of 1921) and this was privately built over a ten-year period and went into service in 2005 as No.7.

In popular culture
Wilbert Awdry based the character of Peter Sam on a Kerr Stuart Tattoo in The Railway Series.

Preservation

References

 
 L.T.C. Rolt, A Hunslet Hundred, David & Charles, 1964, (Kerr, Stuart & Company – pages 86–101).

External links 

 Industrial Railway Record –  Kerr Stuart "Wren" class

Locomotive manufacturers of the United Kingdom